"Red" is a song written and recorded by American singer-songwriter Taylor Swift for her fourth studio album, of the same name (2012). It was produced by Dann Huff, Nathan Chapman, and Swift. Big Machine Records released the song onto the iTunes Store on October 2, 2012, as Red second promotional single, and to U.S. country radio on June 24, 2013, as an official single. Musically, "Red" is a  country, soft rock, and pop rock song, using acoustic banjo and guitars, and electronic vocal manipulation. Lyrically about a tumultuous relationship, the refrain likens the conflicting emotions to a spectrum of colors, including the color red which symbolizes the ensuing intense feelings.

Swift performed the track on many television shows and included it on the set list of her 2013–14 Red Tour. A music video for "Red", a compilation of footage from the tour, was released on July 3, 2013. Swift's acoustic rendition of "Red" at the 2013 Country Music Association Awards, featuring Alison Krauss and Vince Gill on background vocals, was released on November 8, 2013. The single received mixed to positive reviews from contemporary critics; some complimented the production for straddling the boundary between country and mainstream pop, while some other deemed it inconsistent and underwhelming.

"Red" peaked within the top 30 on record charts of Australia, Canada, Ireland, New Zealand, and the U.K. In the U.S., it peaked at number six on the Billboard Hot 100 and number two on the Hot Country Songs, on which it stayed for 42 weeks and became Swift's longest-charting song. The single received certifications in Australia, the U.K., and the U.S. A re-recorded version of "Red", titled "Red (Taylor's Version)", was released as part of Swift's second re-recorded album Red (Taylor's Version) on November 12, 2021.

Background and release
Singer-songwriter Taylor Swift released her third studio album, Speak Now, in October 2010. She wrote the album entirely by herself and co-produced it with Nathan Chapman, her longtime collaborator. The album's sound expands on the country pop sound of her two previous albums, with elements of radio-friendly pop crossover that had been evident on its predecessor Fearless (2008). On Speak Now follow-up, Red, Swift aimed to experiment beyond her previous albums' formulaic country pop sound.

Swift initially continued working with Chapman in her career base of Nashville, Tennessee, until her creativity "started wandering to all the places [she] could go" while she was writing "Red", the title track, on a plane in September 2011. Scott Borchetta, president of Swift's then-label Big Machine Records, overheard the original production by Chapman and suggested a pop-oriented sound. After several failed attempts at the desired sound, Swift asked Borchetta to recruit Swedish producer Max Martin, whose chart-topping pop tunes had intrigued Swift by "how [they] can just land a chorus". Even though Swift went to Los Angeles to work with Martin and his frequent collaborator Shellback on three songs on Red, they did not produce the final version of "Red". It was produced by Swift, Chapman, and Dann Huff—a Nashville-based country producer.

To promote Red, Swift premiered one album track on Good Morning America and released it onto the U.S. iTunes Store, each week from September 24 until the album's release date of October 22, 2012, as part of a four-week release countdown. "Red" was released as the second promotional single from Red during the second countdown week, on October 2, 2012. The song was released to U.S. country radio as a single from the album on June 24, 2013, by Big Machine Records.

Composition

"Red" is a genre-spanning song; it incorporates elements of country music characteristic of Swift's previous songs, such as acoustic banjo, guitars, and fiddles, and twang. Critics noted the song features a radio-friendly production with a pop chorus, which includes electronic vocal manipulation where Swift sings the title "r-r-red". Marc Hogan from Spin wrote that "Red" is a "glossy soft rocker" featuring a "stomping four-on-the-floor beat, back-porch twang, adult-contemporary orchestration, and Top 40-ready electronic vocal effects." In Time Out, Nick Levine described it as pop rock with minimal country influences. Jewly Hight writing for American Songwriter found the song's juxtaposition of country elements and upbeat pop production straddles the perceived boundary between country pop and dance music.

The lyrics are about the conflicting emotions recollected from lost romance. In the refrain, the lyrics correspond its different stages to different colors: "losing him" to blue, "missing him" to dark gray, and "loving him" to red. Throughout the verses, Swift compares her lost love to experiences including "driving a new Maserati down a dead end street" and "trying to change your mind once you're already flying through the free fall". Jon Dolan from Rolling Stone compared Swift's "stark-relief emotional mapping" on "Red" to the songwriting of Carole King and Joni Mitchell. Explaining the title, Swift said on Good Morning America: "I wrote this song about the fact that somethings are just hard to forget because the emotions involved with them were so intense, and to me intense emotion is red."

Live performances and music video

Swift performed "Red" for the first time at BBC Radio 1's Teen Awards, held at Wembley Arena on October 7, 2012, in London. On October 15, 2012, Swift performed "Red" as part of her concert for VH1 Storytellers, held at Harvey Mudd College in Claremont, California. During the first release week of Red, Swift appeared and performed the song on television shows including Good Morning America, Late Show with David Letterman, and The Ellen DeGeneres Show. She also included the song in her performances at festivals and awards shows, including the CMA Music Festival on June 6, 2013, the 2013 CMT Music Awards, and the 2013 Country Music Association Awards (CMA). The performance at the 2013 CMA Awards on November 6, 2013, featured an acoustic version of "Red" with Alison Krauss on fiddle and Vince Gill on guitar (both on background vocals), Sam Bush on mandolin, Edgar Meyer on acoustic bass, and Eric Darken on percussion. It was released for digital download through the iTunes Store by Big Machine Records the following day.

Swift included "Red" on the set list of the Red Tour (2013–14). A music video for "Red", directed by Kenny Jackson and featuring footage from the tour, was released on July 4, 2013. It was nominated for Video of the Year and Female Video of the Year at the 2014 CMT Music Awards. During the September 17, 2015 concert of Swift's 1989 World Tour in Columbus, Ohio, she performed a stripped-down version of "Red" on an acoustic guitar. It was a "surprise song" on the set list of her Reputation Stadium Tour concert at Pasadena, California, on May 18, 2018. Swift also performed "Red" during one-off concerts including a private concert in Paris on January 28, 2013, DirecTV's Super Saturday Night (part of a series of pre-Super Bowl concerts) in Houston on February 4, 2017, and the City of Lover concert in Paris on September 9, 2019.

Critical reception
Upon its initial release, "Red" received mixed to positive reviews from contemporary critics. Rolling Stone provided a positive review, writing that the production effectively accompanied the "simple but effective" lyrics. Billy Dukes of Taste of Country gave "Red" a 4.5/5 rating, applauding the song for expanding Swift's musical versatility and songwriting capabilities: "[toying] with colors like a skilled artist, ... this song is her Sistine Chapel." Marc Hogan from Spin felt the lyrics were memorable but said that the genre-spanning production made it unfocused. In a lukewarm review, Entertainment Weekly Grady Smith wrote the lyrics "paint a rather blurry portrait" of the intense emotions Swift meant to express. Smith remarked that while the song was tolerable, the "poppy" production underwhelmed its emotional sentiments.

Reviews of "Red" in the context of Red album reviews remained mixed to positive. Jonathan Keefe from Slant Magazine and Randall Roberts from the Los Angeles Times commented that the underwhelming and occasionally clumsy metaphors of "Red" were subpar for Swift's lyrical abilities. Billboard appreciated the lyrical sentiments but felt that the electronic elements might not appeal to Swift's traditional country audience. On a positive side, Jewly Hight from American Songwriter lauded the country-pop production as "sensory, synesthesia-style poetry", and Jon Dolan from Rolling Stone selected "Red" as one of the songs on the album that proved Swift's maturity as a songwriter. Jordan Sargent, in a 2017 retrospective review of Red, called the title track "perhaps the album's best pop song since Swift flirts with Fleetwood Mac".

In a review of Swift's entire catalog, Jane Song from Paste wrote: "Maybe it's not the best Red cut, but it's worth remembering." Rob Sheffield from Rolling Stone compared the pop/Eurodisco crossover to the music of Shania Twain and the "color-tripping lyric" to the songwriting of Prince, calling "Red" a representation of "this century's most ridiculously masterful megapop manifesto". At the 2014 BMI Country Awards, "Red" was one of the award-winning "Country Awards Top 50 Songs"

Commercial performance
In the U.S., "Red" debuted and peaked at number six on the Billboard Hot 100 chart dated October 11, 2012. It was Swift's 13th song to reach the top 10 on the Hot 100. On the Hot Country Songs, "Red" peaked at number two on the chart dated October 20, 2012, and was Swift's longest-charting song, spending 42 weeks. By November 2017, "Red" had sold two million digital copies in the U.S. The single was certified double platinum by the Recording Industry Association of America (RIAA) in July 2018.

The single reached the top 30 of record charts in English-speaking countries, peaking at number five in Canada, number 14 in New Zealand, number 25 in Ireland, number 26 in the U.K., and number 30 in Australia. It was certified gold in Australia (35,000 copies sold) and silver in the U.K. (200,000 equivalent units based on sales and streaming). "Red" peaked at lower-tier positions on charts in Japan (number 43), Spain (number 46), and Italy (number 56).

Credits and personnel 
Adapted from the liner notes of Red

 Taylor Swift – lead vocals, backing vocals, songwriter, producer
 Nathan Chapman – producer, acoustic guitar, percussion
 Dann Huff – producer, bouzouki
 Steve Marcantonio – recording
 Seth Morton – assistant recording
 David Huff – digital editing
 Justin Niebank – mixing
 Drew Bollman – assisting mixing
 Hank Williams – mastering
 Mike Griffith – production coordinator
 Jason Campbell – production coordinator
 Tom Bukovac – electric guitar
 Paul Franklin – steel guitar
 Ilya Toshinskiy – ganjo
 Jimmie Sloas – bass
 Jonathan Yudkin – cello, fiddle
 Charlie Judge – upright piano, synth, B-3 organ
 Aaron Sterling – drums

Charts

Weekly charts

Year-end charts

Certifications

"Red (Taylor's Version)"

Swift re-recorded the track for her re-recorded album Red (Taylor's Version), which was released on November 12, 2021, through Republic Records. Prior to the album's release, Swift posted a snippet of the re-recorded track via her Instagram on October 23. Compared to the original version, "Red (Taylor's Version)" features a more refined and mellowed production.

The re-recorded track peaked within the top 10 of the singles chart in Ireland and Singapore, and top 20 Australia, Canada, Malaysia, and New Zealand. It also charted on the Billboard Global 200 at number 13.

Personnel
Adapted from the liner notes of Red (Taylor's Version)

 Taylor Swift – lead vocals, background vocals, songwriter, producer
 Christopher Rowe – producer, vocal engineer
 David Payne – recording engineer
 Dan Burns – additional engineer
 Austin Brown – assistant engineer, assistant editor
 Bryce Bordone – engineer
 Derek Garten – engineer, editor
 Serban Ghenea – mixer
 Amos Heller – bass guitar
 Jonathan Yudkin – bouzouki, strings
 Matt Billingslea – drums, percussion
 Max Bernstein – electric guitar
 Paul Sidoti – electric guitar
 Mike Meadows – Hammond B3, synthesizers
 David Cook – piano

Charts

References

2013 singles
2012 songs
Taylor Swift songs
Big Machine Records singles
Songs written by Taylor Swift
Song recordings produced by Taylor Swift
Song recordings produced by Dann Huff
Song recordings produced by Nathan Chapman (record producer)
Song recordings produced by Chris Rowe